Jeff Daniels (born 1978) is an American-Australian documentary film director and producer.

Early life 
Daniels was born in 1978 and raised in Queens, New York. He moved to Australia in 2001 and now lives in Melbourne.

Career
Daniels made his first film, The 10 Conditions of Love over seven years while working as a school teacher in Melbourne. An observational film about exiled Uyghur activist and human rights leader, Rebiya Kadeer, the film made international headlines after Chinese hackers attacked the Melbourne International Film Festival website, in an attempt to disrupt its screening. Several Chinese directors withdrew their films from the festival in response to the planned screening of Daniels' film.

Fair Game follows the life and career of AFL footballer, Héritier Lumumba who spoke out about racism in the Collingwood Football Club. The film uncovered systemic racism present within the club and was cited in a subsequent review into the club's response to incidents of racism and cultural safety. The report found the club was "at best ineffective, or at worst exacerbated the impact of the racist incidents". A week after the report's findings were leaked, the club's president Eddie McGuire resigned.

Mother with a Gun won Best Australian Documentary at the 2016 Antenna Documentary Film Festival and was selected for the documentary film festival, DOC NYC. The film follows leader of the Jewish Defense League, Shelley Rubin, on her path to violent extremism.

Television Event is an archive-based documentary tracing the production and socio-political reception of 1983 made-for-TV movie, The Day After. The Day After controversially imagined a nuclear attack on Lawrence, Kansas and its broadcast reached over 100 million Americans. Daniels' film depicts the anxious reaction to The Day After and the change it engendered in president Ronald Reagan's nuclear weapons policy. The film was set to have its world premiere at the Tribeca Film Festival in 2020 but did not screen there until 2021 due to the COVID-19 pandemic. For it, Daniels won Best Director of a Documentary Feature at RiverRun Film Festival.

Filmography

Feature-length films
 The 10 Conditions of Love (2009)
 Mother with a Gun (2016)
 Fair Game (2017)
 Television Event (2020)

Awards

|-| 
| 2022
| Television Event
| Uranium International Film Festival Best Feature Documentary
| 
|-
| 2021
| Television Event
| Cinema for Peace Foundation Award for Most Valuable Documentary
| 
|-
| 2021
| Television Event
| Atom Award for Best History Documentary
| 
|-
| 2021
| Television Event
| Hot Springs Documentary Film Festival Award for Best Documentary Feature
|  
|-
| 2021
| Television Event
| Sydney Film Festival Award for Best Australian Documentary 
| 
|-
|2021
| Television Event
| Philadelphia Film Festival Award for Best Feature Documentary 
| 
|- 
|2021
| Television Event
| Newport Beach Film Festival Award for Best Feature Documentary 
| 
|-
| 2021
| Television Event
| Footcandle Film Festival Audience Favourite Feature Award
| 
|-
| 2021
| Television Event
| Sidewalk Film Festival Programmers' Feature Film Award
| 
|-
| 2021
| Television Event
| RiverRun Film Festival Award for Best Director of a Documentary Feature
| 
|-
| 2021
| Television Event
| Full Frame Center for Documentary Filmmakers Award 
|  
|-
| 2018
| Fair Game
| Australian Directors' Guild Award for Best Director
| 
|-
| 2018
| Fair Game
| Atom Award for Best Social & Political Issue Documentary
| 
|-
| 2016
| Mother with a Gun
| Antenna Award for Best Documentary 
| 
|-
| 2011
| The 10 Conditions of Love
| Bellingham Film Festival Audience Award for Best Film
| 
|-
| 2010
| The 10 Conditions of Love
| Atom Award for Best Social & Political Issue Documentary
| 
|-
| 2010
| The 10 Conditions of Love
| Inside Film Awards Independent Spirit Award
|  
|-
| 2010
| The 10 Conditions of Love
| FCCA Award for Best Documentary Director 
|  
|-
| 2010
| The 10 Conditions of Love
| Melbourne International Film Festival Audience Award 
|

References

Australian film directors
1978 births
Living people
Film directors from Melbourne